Donald M. "Don" Hooper (born October 2, 1945) is a Vermont educator, environmental activist, and political figure.  He served in the Vermont House of Representatives for four terms, and as Secretary of State of Vermont for one.

Early life
Hooper was born in Hartford, Connecticut on October 2, 1945.  He graduated from Harvard University with a Bachelor of Arts degree in 1968, and he received a Master of Education degree from Harvard in 1973.

In his early career, Hooper was a Peace Corps teacher in Botswana.  He later served as coordinator of instruction and acting director for the Central Vermont region of the Community College of Vermont.  He also worked as director of operations for the Vermont Natural Resources Council.

Political career
A longtime resident of Brookfield, Vermont, Hooper was elected to the Vermont House of Representatives as a Democrat in 1984.  He was reelected three times, and served from January 1985 to January 1993.  During his House career, Hooper served as chairman of the Government Operations Committee, and served on the Natural Resources and Ways and Means Committees.

In 1992, Hooper was the successful Democratic nominee for Secretary of State.  He defeated Republican nominee James F. Milne, and succeeded Jim Douglas, who ran unsuccessfully for the US Senate.

Hooper served one term, January 1993 to January 1995.  In 1994, Hooper was defeated for reelection by Milne, who went on to serve two terms.

Later career
Hooper later worked as the Northeast Regional Representative for the National Wildlife Federation.  He retired in 2016.

Publications
Don Hooper is the illustrator of I Could Hardly Keep From Laughing: An Illustrated Collection of Vermont Humor, co-authored with Bill Mares. Publication date: December 7, 2021, by Rootstock Publishing, of Montpelier, Vermont.

Family
Hooper is married to Allison Hooper, the co-founder of the Vermont Butter and Cheese Company.  They are the parents of three sons, Miles, Sam, and Jay.

In 2016, Jay Hooper was elected to the Vermont House of Representatives.

References

Sources

Internet

1945 births
Living people
Peace Corps volunteers
Politicians from Hartford, Connecticut
People from Brookfield, Vermont
Democratic Party members of the Vermont House of Representatives
Secretaries of State of Vermont
Harvard Graduate School of Education alumni